Abbas Dabbaghi Souraki (born 9 March 1987) is an Iranian freestyle wrestler. Competing in the 55 kg division he won a bronze medal at the 2007 Asian Championships and a silver medal at the 2009 World Cup. He placed tenth at the 2008 Summer Olympics. 

Dabbaghi also won a silver medal in Junior Worlds 2006 and gold medal Takhti Cup 2009.

Major results

References

External links
 Athlete bio on beijing2008.com

Living people
1987 births
Olympic wrestlers of Iran
Wrestlers at the 2008 Summer Olympics
Iranian male sport wrestlers
Sportspeople from Sari, Iran
Asian Wrestling Championships medalists
20th-century Iranian people
21st-century Iranian people